Jerry Maxwell Reed (born October 8, 1955), is an American former professional baseball pitcher. He pitched for nine seasons in Major League Baseball (MLB), during 1981–1990.

Career

Pre-MLB career
Reed was originally drafted out of Enka High School in Candler, NC by the Minnesota Twins. He was chosen in the 11th round of the 1973 MLB draft, but did not sign, instead opting to attend Western Carolina University, where he threw the first no-hitter in the school's history. After four years at WCU, Reed was again drafted by the Philadelphia Phillies in the 22nd round of the 1977 MLB draft. He played the next four seasons in their farm system before earning a September call-up in 1981.

Phillies
Reed pitched just 4 innings in 4 games in the majors in 1981.

Indians
Reed pitched a handful of games during the rest of September for the Indians, then returned to the minors for the entire  season. In , he spent most of the year in the major leagues for the first time, pitching in 33 games (including 5 starts).

Mariners
Reed caught on with the Seattle Mariners, starting the season back in the minors, but he would eventually get called back to the majors, going 4–0 in 11 games, and he would then spend the next three full seasons pitching out of the Mariners' bullpen.  was his best season, when Reed had a 3.42 ERA in 39 games, with 7 saves. Reed was released early on in the  season.

Career winding down
The Boston Red Sox were the next team to pick up Reed, but his ERA had ballooned to 4.80, and he was released in August. After the season, he made his way to the Senior Professional Baseball Association, where he pitched in 4 games for the St. Petersburg Pelicans before the league folded, and Reed's professional baseball career ended along with it.

Reed wound up pitching in 238 major league games, all but 12 in relief, with a record of 20–19 and 18 saves.

References

External links

1955 births
Living people
Águilas del Zulia players
American expatriate baseball players in Venezuela
American expatriate baseball players in Canada
Baseball players from North Carolina
Boston Red Sox players
Calgary Cannons players
Charleston Charlies players
Cleveland Indians players
Maine Guides players
Major League Baseball pitchers
Oklahoma City 89ers players
Peninsula Pilots players
People from Bryson City, North Carolina
Philadelphia Phillies players
Reading Phillies players
Seattle Mariners players
Spartanburg Phillies players
St. Petersburg Pelicans players 
Western Carolina Catamounts baseball players